Grishkovka is a rural locality (a selo) and the administrative center of Grishkovsky Selsoviet of Nemetsky National District, Altai Krai, Russia. The population was 1330 as of 2016. There are 5 streets.

Geography 
Grishkovka is located within the Kulunda Plain, 19 km southwest of Galbshtadt (the district's administrative centre) by road. Andreyevka is the nearest rural locality.

Ethnicity 
The village is inhabited by Russians and Germans.

References 

Rural localities in Nemetsky National District